The Jondal Tunnel is a road tunnel in the Hardanger region of Vestland county, Norway. The tunnel is part of Norwegian County Road 49 and it lies in Kvinnherad and Ullensvang municipalities. Cars can drive from Bergen to Tørvikbygda, then take a ferry to Jondal, then go through this tunnel, then a short drive to the Folgefonna Tunnel before getting to the town of Odda. From there it is a short drive on the narrow route 13 to the European route E134 highway which leads to Oslo.

Work on the tunnel began in October 2009. The tunnel was opened on 7 September 2012 by Prime Minister Jens Stoltenberg. The project cost almost . This was reduced in 2018 and on 8 June 2020 the toll was removed.

References

Ullensvang
Kvinnherad
Road tunnels in Vestland